Xaxa may refer to:

Places
 Xaxa, Tibet, a village in Tibet
 Xaxa, Botswana, a village in Botswana
 Xaxa, Cape Verde, a village in the municipality São Miguel, Cape Verde

People
 Sahadeva Xaxa, 2009 candidate for Talsara (Odisha Vidhan Sabha constituency)
 Pyari Xaxa, participant of 2015 AFC U-19 Women's Championship qualification